The 2021 KNSB Dutch Sprint Championships in speed skating were held in Heerenveen at the Thialf ice skating rink from 28 November to 29 November 2020. The tournament was part of the 2020–2021 speed skating season. Hein Otterspeer and Jutta Leerdam won the sprint titles. The sprint championships were held a week after the 2021 KNSB Dutch Allround Championships.

Schedule

Medalists

Men's sprint podia

Women's sprint podia

Classification

Men's sprint

Women's sprint

References

KNSB Dutch Sprint Championships
KNSB Dutch Sprint Championships
2021 Sprint